Stegopterna is a genus of black flies (insects in the family Simuliidae). There are about 15 described species in Stegopterna.

Species
These 15 species belong to the genus Stegopterna:

 Stegopterna acra Currie, Adler & Wood, 2004 c g
 Stegopterna byrrangii Yankovsky, 2000 c g
 Stegopterna decafilis Rubtsov, 1971 c g
 Stegopterna diplomutata Currie & Hunter, 2003 c g
 Stegopterna duodecimata (Rubtsov, 1940) c g
 Stegopterna emergens (Stone, 1952) i c g
 Stegopterna freyi (Enderlein, 1929) c g
 Stegopterna hamuligera Yankovsky, 1977 c g
 Stegopterna mutata (Malloch, 1914) i c g b (mutated black fly)
 Stegopterna nukabirana Ono, 1977 c g
 Stegopterna permutata (Dyar & Shannon, 1927) c g
 Stegopterna poljakovae Patrusheva, 1977 c g
 Stegopterna takeshii Takaoka, 2005 c g
 Stegopterna tschukotensis Rubtsov, 1971 c g
 Stegopterna xantha Currie, Adler & Wood, 2004 c g

Data sources: i = ITIS, c = Catalogue of Life, g = GBIF, b = Bugguide.net

References

Further reading

 
 

Simuliidae
Articles created by Qbugbot
Culicomorpha genera